Daniel Pixiades (5 July 1931) is a Yugoslav and Serbian poet of Slovak origin. He is the author of poetry collections in Slovak, Serbian and Croatian, and has been translated into many world languages. He is a member of the Association of Writers of Serbia, Slovakia, Vojvodina and Montenegro.

Biography 
Daniel Pixiades was born on July 5, 1931, in the town of Kisač in Vojvodina. He graduated from the teachers' school in Sombor in 1950. He worked as a teacher in Seleuš, Veliko Središte, Kulpin, Sremski Karlovci, Stari Bar and Sutomore. He worked for a year in the Catering Chamber in Novi Sad. At the end of September 1974, he moved to Canada with his family. Today he lives in Thunder Bay, Ontario.

Literary work 
Pixiades collaborated with the Czechoslovak newspaper Ljudove zvesci and volunteered on the local Yugoslav radio station.

In Canada, he was initially a contributor and then editor of the newspaper Naše novine (1977-1988), around which many poets from Canada and around the world gathered. There, Pixiades published poems, stories, essays and articles.

He was a member of the Association Desanka Maksimović.

As he lived in the former Yugoslavia, Pixiades wrote songs in his native Slovak and Serbo-Croatian languages. They have been published in magazines, poem collections and anthologies.

He is a member of the Writers' Association of Slovakia, Serbia, Vojvodina and Montenegro.

Published works 
Pixiades combined poetry published in Serbian in Yugoslavia with poetry published in Canada in the collection of poems Being Outside/Biti Izvan (1976). The book was published by the publishing house Kultura in Bački Petrovac. The same publisher has published two more collections of songs by Pixiades in Serbian: To the Heart of the Earth/Ka srcu zemlje (2005) and North from Everywhere/Odasvud sjever (2006).

In 2021, the book Water Festival appeared in St. Petersburg, translated into Russian by the writer and translator Vladimir Baboshin. In 2021, the book In the Honor of the Grass translated into Belarusian by Diana Lazarevich was published in Belarus.

Collections of poetry in Slovak 
 Vlny kotvy vlny – Talasi sidra talasi "Obzor", Novi Sad, 1974.
 Úlet za srdcom – Uzlet za srcem, SVC, Bačsky Petrovec, 2011.
 Zbrazdene nebo – Poorano nebo, SVC, Bačsky Petrovec, 2014.
 Toky – Tokovi, SVC, 2016.
 Klaniam sa trsu – Klanjam se mladicama, SVC, 2017.
 Kaleidoskop, SVC, 2017.
 Zápisky Bez poradia – Zapisi bez redosleda (першая кніга ўспамінаў), Artprint, Novi Sad, 2018.

Collections of poetry for children in Slovak 
 Morska Riša – Morsko carstvo, SVC, 2009.
 Slávnosť – Svečanost, SVC, 2017.
 Slneční pútnici – Sunčani putnici, SVC, 2017.
 Rybka Žiara – Ribica Žiška, SVC, 2015.

Biographies in Serbian 
 Zapisi bez redosleda (druga knjiga memoara), Prometej, Novi Sad, 2015.
 Sunčani putnici, SVC, 2018.

Collections of poetry in Serbian 
 Svečanost vode, Beograd, Alma, 2017.
 Putokaz ka zvijezdi, Beograd, Alma, 2017.
 Putnici na jug, Beograd, Alma, 2017.
 Prvijenci i ostaci, Beograd, Alma, 2017.

Collections of poetry in English 
 Interlude-Pauza, Emerson Street Printing, Thunder Bay, 2011.
 Road sign toward the stars – Putokaz ka zvijezdi, LULU Press, 2017.
 Celebration of water – Proslava voda, LULU Press, 2017.
 Road sign toward the star – Putokaz ka zvijezdi, AMAZON, 2019.
 Celebration of water – Proslava voda, AMAZON, 2019.

References

Literature 
 Celebration of water – Proslava voda, LULU Press, 2017.
 Road sign toward the star – Putokaz ka zvijezdi, AMAZON, 2019.
 Ka srcu zemlje / Danijel Piksijades. – Bački Petrovac : Kultura, 2005 (Bački Petrovac : Kultura).
 Prvijenci i ostaci / Danijel Piksijades. – Beograd : Алма, 2017 (Mladenovac : Presing).
 Interlude / Daniel Piksiades ; [translator Smiljana Piksiades]. – [Ontario] : D. Piksiades, 2011.
 Svečanost vode / Danijel Piksijades. – Beograd : Алма, 2017 (Mladenovac : Presing).
 Toky / Daniel Pixiades ; [zo srbčiny preložila Katarína Pucovská]. – Báčsky Petrovec : Slovenské vydavateĺské centrum, 2016 (Kysáč : Grafoffice).
 Putnici na jug / Danijel Piksijades. – Beograd : Алма, 2017 (Mladenovac : Presing).
 Putokaz ka zvijezdi / Danijel Piksijades. – Beograd : Алма, 2017 (Mladenovac : Presing).

1931 births
Living people
Writers from Novi Sad
Slovaks of Vojvodina
Yugoslav writers
Slovak writers
Slovak poets
Yugoslav emigrants to Canada